Chanakan Sricha-Um (born ) is a Thai track cyclist, and part of the national team. She competed in the team sprint event at the 2010 UCI Track Cycling World Championships.

References

External links
 Profile at cyclingarchives.com

1991 births
Living people
Chanakan Srichaum
Chanakan Srichaum
Place of birth missing (living people)
Cyclists at the 2010 Asian Games
Southeast Asian Games medalists in cycling
Chanakan Srichaum
Competitors at the 2011 Southeast Asian Games
Chanakan Srichaum
Chanakan Srichaum